Charles Finley (March 26, 1865 – March 18, 1941) was a United States representative from Kentucky and son of Hugh Franklin Finley.

Biography
Finley was born in Williamsburg, Kentucky, where he attended the common and subscription schools. Later, he attended Milligan College. He engaged in business as a coal operator, banker, and publisher.

Finley was a member of the Kentucky House of Representatives 1894-1896 and a delegate to the Republican state convention in 1895. He served as Secretary of State of Kentucky from 1896 to 1900.

Indicted for murder
On January 30, 1900, Democrat William Goebel was shot while the results of the previous year's election for Governor of Kentucky was still being contested; Goebel was declared the winner, and died shortly afterwards. Finley was one of several Republicans suspected of involvement; they were indicted, and arrest warrants were issued. Along with several others, Finley fled to Indiana to escape prosecution. The Republican governor there refused to honor extradition requests, and they continued to reside in Indiana while the case was litigated.

In 1909, Kentucky Governor Augustus E. Willson extended clemency to Finley and other suspects; they never faced trial, and then returned to Kentucky.

Other service
Finley was chairman of the Republican executive committee of the Eleventh Kentucky Congressional District from 1912 to 1928. He was elected as a Republican to the Seventy-first Congress to fill the vacancy caused by the resignation of John M. Robsion and was reelected to the Seventy-second Congress and served from February 15, 1930, to March 3, 1933. He was not a candidate for renomination in 1932.

After leaving Congress, he retired from business activities before dying in Williamsburg, Kentucky in 1941. He was buried in Highland Cemetery, Williamsburg, Kentucky.

References

Sources

Internet

Newspapers

External links

1865 births
1941 deaths
People from Whitley County, Kentucky
Republican Party members of the Kentucky House of Representatives
Secretaries of State of Kentucky
Kentucky politicians convicted of crimes
Republican Party members of the United States House of Representatives from Kentucky